Albert Joseph Charles Devèze (6 June 1881 – 28 November 1959) was a Belgian liberal politician and minister. Devèze was a doctor in law and a lawyer. He was a liberal municipality Council member in Schaerbeek and in Ixelles and a member of parliament for the district of Brussels (1912–1939 and 1946–1958) and for the district of Verviers (1939–1946). Devèze was President of the Liberal Party in 1927-1932 and was a minister of defense (1920–1923, 1932–1936 and 1949–1950), vice prime-minister (1949–1950), minister of interior (1939–1940) and of economy (1946). In 1930, he became minister of state.

Sources

 Presidents of the Belgian liberal party

External links
 

1880s births
1926 deaths
Politicians from Ypres
Liberal Party (Belgium) politicians
Belgian Ministers of State

Belgian Ministers of Defence